Reginald Carter may refer to:

 Reginald Carter (Australian cricketer) (1888–1970), Australian cricketer
 Reginald Carter (English cricketer) (born 1933), English cricketer 
 Reginald Carter (headmaster) (1868–1936), headmaster of Bedford School
 Reginald Carter (politician) (1887–1961), Australian politician
 Reggie Carter (1957–1999), American basketball player
 Reg Carter (1886–1949), British cartoonist